SB 203580 is a specific inhibitor of p38α and p38β which suppresses downstream activation of MAPKAP kinase-2 and heat shock protein 27.  At low concentrations, it does not inhibit JNK activity. SB-203580 was recently assigned the INN Adezamapimod, and is currently in phase 2 clinical trials to prevent post-operative tissue adhesion.

References

4-Pyridyl compounds
Imidazoles
Sulfoxides
Fluoroarenes